Millennium is the third studio album (second in the United States) by American boy band Backstreet Boys, released by Jive Records on May 18, 1999. It was a highly anticipated follow-up to both their US debut album, and their second internationally released album. It was their first album to be released in both the US and internationally in the same form, at the same time.

Millennium held the record for most shipments in one year, with 11 million shipments sold in the United States in 1999. It was nominated for five Grammy Awards and  became one of the best-selling albums of all time, selling 24 million copies worldwide. The Backstreet Boys promoted Millennium through the Into the Millennium Tour, which became one of the fastest-grossing tours of all time.

Background
Following the release of their first US album Backstreet Boys and second international album Backstreet's Back selling 27 million copies worldwide, the Backstreet Boys were met with critics accusing them of being a "flash in the pan" and misconceptions that they earned a lot of money. From 1997 to 1998, the band filed a lawsuit against manager Lou Pearlman, stating that they only received $300,000 from recording and touring while he kept over $10 million. Pearlman claimed to be the "sixth Backstreet Boy", and revealed to them that he managed rival boy band NSYNC, who sold over 6 million copies of their debut album, stating that "it's business". On September 18, 1998, the band left their management company Wright Stuff, which was formerly associated with Pearlman's record company Trans Continental Records.

During the same period, the band also dealt with personal tragedies; Kevin Richardson suffered two family deaths, Brian Littrell needed to undergo open heart surgery, Howie Dorough lost his sister from lupus, and the band's producer Denniz Pop died of stomach cancer. The album was initially titled Larger Than Life, which Dorough described as "almost like a thank-you song for all they've done" because they were always supporting the band.

Promotion
Every version of Britney Spears' debut album ...Baby One More Time that was released prior to Millennium contained previews of three songs as hidden tracks, placed at the end of the album against Spears' wishes. The band appeared on Saturday Night Live and Total Request Live during the album's release date, and filmed a Disney Channel concert special called Backstreet Boys in Concert the same day.

Singles
Four singles were released from the album:
"I Want It That Way" is the lead single from the album, released on April 12, 1999. It is one of the Backstreet Boys' most commercially successful songs and is often regarded as the group's signature song.
"Larger than Life" is the second single, released on September 7, 1999.
"Show Me the Meaning of Being Lonely" was released as the third single, released on December 14, 1999. It peaked at number six on the Billboard Hot 100 during the week of March 18, 2000.
"The One" is the fourth and final single from the album, being released on May 1, 2000. "Don't Want You Back" was originally going to be the fourth single based on a TRL fan vote. However, when Nick Carter called in to vote for "The One", the fans followed after him.

Tour

The album's supporting tour, Into the Millennium Tour, started from June 2, 1999, and ended on March 15, 2000, with a total of 123 shows in 84 cities spanning three legs. Their concert at the Georgia Dome in Atlanta, was the fifth most attended concert in American history, and the most attended concert by a pop artist.

Critical reception

Writing for AllMusic, Stephen Thomas Erlewine wrote that "Millennium has no pretense of being anything other than an album for the moment, delivering more of everything that made Backstreet's Back a blockbuster". Robert Christgau gave Millennium a two-star honorable mention, stating that the album is "softening it a little up for their younger demographic, sexing it up a little for their own peace of mind", specifically praising "I Want It That Way" and "Larger than Life". Jim Farber of Entertainment Weekly gave the album a B−, stating that they have taken risks in their lyrics, as "Teen acts normally can’t acknowledge their romantic power. They have to remain the longing ones in order to seal the twin fantasies of purity and accessibility".

Arion Berger of Rolling Stone commented that the album was "prefabricated, too pretty, suspiciously well choreographed", criticizing Nick Carter's straining vocals on "I Need You Tonight", stating that "It's Gotta Be You" was a rehash of their 1997 single "Everybody (Backstreet's Back)" and mentioned how "The Perfect Fan" evaporated throughout the song. However, he praised "Show Me the Meaning of Being Lonely", describing it as "digging its melodic claws into your skull on the first listen [...] it's the swooniest blending of the five vocalists' timbres to date, and mighty pretty besides". Writing for Spin, Joshua Clover criticized the opening track "Larger than Life", stating that it "boogies deftly and punks daftly [...] but huffs fame like glue", while praising other uptempo songs such as "I Want It That Way", "Don't Want You Back", "It's Gotta Be You", and "Spanish Eyes". He concluded by stating that while "the calendar flipping soundtrack" isn't Robbie Williams' song "Millennium" (1998), it 'smashes Silverchair's "Anthem for the Year 2000"' (1999), comparing the band to Alanis Morissette than NSYNC.

Commercial performance
Millennium debuted at number one on the Billboard 200, where it remained for 10 non-consecutive weeks. It sold 1,134,000 copies in its first week of release, breaking the previous Nielsen SoundScan record held by Garth Brooks for single-week record sales. This record was subsequently overtaken in 2000 by NSYNC with the release of No Strings Attached. Millennium sold nearly 500,000 copies in the US on its first day alone, setting a record for first-day sales, and became the best-selling album of 1999, selling 9,445,732 albums. It remained on the Billboard chart for 93 weeks, eventually selling over 13 million copies in the United States and being certified 13 times platinum.

As of 2016, the album stands as the fifth best selling album in the United States of the SoundScan era with 12.3 million units sold. In 2003 it was also reported as being the fourth biggest seller for Music Club sales in the US over the past 14 years with sales of 1.59 million, though these sales are not included in SoundScan's total. In Canada, Millennium was the seventh biggest selling album since 1995 in the Canadian Soundscan sales era up to end of December 2007, while in Japan, sales reached 1 million according to Billboard. In 2015, Millennium became one of the best-selling albums of all time, selling 24 million copies worldwide.

Track listing

Notes
 signifies additional vocal production

Personnel
Credits for Millennium adapted from AllMusic and album's liner notes.

Backstreet Boys
 Nick Carter (tenor/baritone) – vocals, additional vocal arrangements 
 Brian Littrell – (tenor/falsetto) vocals, additional vocal arrangements , BSB vocal arrangements and choir conducting 
 Kevin Richardson (bass) – vocals; additional vocal arrangements, musical arrangements, keyboards, and bass 
 Howie Dorough – (tenor/falsetto) vocals
 AJ McLean – (baritone) vocals, additional vocal arrangements 

Additional musicians
 Hans Åkeson – viola 
 Tomas Andersson – violin 
 Torbjörn Bernhardsson – viola 
 Randy Bowland – guitar , acoustic guitar 
 Asa Forsberg – cello 
 Ulf Forsberg – viola 
 Andrew Fromm – piano 
 Ben Glynne – programming 
 Mattias Gustafsson – drum programming, bass, keyboards, and guitars 
 Hart Hollman & The Motown Romance – orchestra 
 Henrik Janson – string arrangements and conducting 
 Uli Janson – string arrangements and conducting 
 Bashiri Johnson – percussion 
 Michael Karlsson - double bass 
 Tomas Lindberg – bass 
 Stephen Lipson – programming 
 Annette Mannheimer - violin 
 Svein H. Martinsen – viola 
 Dominic Miller – guitar 
 Chieli Minucci – acoustic and electric guitars 
 Edwin "Tony" Nicholas – drum programming, bass and keyboards 
 Esbjörn Öhrwall – guitar 
 Samuli Örnstromer – cello 
 Åsa Stove Paulsson - viola 
 Doug Petty – piano 
 Elisabeth Arnberg Ranmo – viola 
 Olle Romo – keyboards and programming 
 Monika Stanikoliska - violin 
 Tates Creek High School Choir – vocals 
 Shannon Anderson, Nancy Baker, Jarred Baugh, Stephen Booth, Leslie Carter, Christina Craddock, Nicholas Daley, Nathan Day, Andrea Dicks, Sean Flaherty, Michael Brad Frazier, Lori Gerlach, Eli Griggs, Noel Harilson, Missy Hogue, Misty Ingels, Jason Jackson, Justin Kearns, Eschelle King, Ryan Kociatek, Toeupu Liu, Rachel Livingston, Rebecca Lord, Kyle Lugger, Ken Mars, Chuck McKenney, Lauren Moss, Charisa Owens, Scott Phillips, Jonathan Prewitt, Merica Rawlings, Luke Sink, Andrea Smith, Beth Smith, Steven Smith, Terri Snider, Heather Tirey, Beth Tober, Mary Trumbo, Patricia Twitty, Cristin Walter, Tasha Webb, Joseph Wells, Ryan West, Shea Popa Wood, Jennifer Schindler
 Peter-John Vettese – additional keyboards and programming 
 Jojje Wadenius – guitar 
 Eric Foster White – bass, electric guitar, keyboards, string orchestration and conducting 
 Dan Wojeciechowski – drums 

Technical
 Adam Barber – engineer , additional vocal engineer 
 John Bates – choir engineer 
 Adam Blackburn – choir engineer 
 Daniel Boom – engineer 
 Tom Coyne – mastering
 Stephen George – basic track engineer and BSB vocal engineer 
 Mick Guzauski – mixing 
 Devon Kirkpatrick – assistant engineer 
 Kristian Lundin – engineering and mixing 
 Max Martin – engineering and mixing 
 Heff Moraes – engineering and mixing 
 Rami – engineering and mixing 
 Bo Reimer – additional engineering , vocal engineer 
 Dawn Reinholtz – assistant engineer 
 Carl Robinson – orchestra engineer 
 Olle Romo – Pro-Tools 
 George Spatta – engineer 
 Chris Trevett – engineering and mixing 
 Eric Foster White – basic track engineer 

Design
 Elan Bongiorno – hair stylist, make-up
 Catherine Furniss – hair stylist, make-up
 Nick Gamma – art direction, design
 Hayley Hill – stylist
 Charles Infante – set design
 Jackie Murphy – art direction, design
 Chris Resig – photography
 Rachel Zoe Rosenzweig – stylist
 Leeza Taylor – photography

Charts

Weekly charts

Year-end charts

Decade-end charts

Certifications and sales

See also
 List of best-selling albums
 List of fastest-selling albums
 List of best-selling albums in Brazil
 List of best-selling albums in Canada
 List of best-selling albums in the United States

Notes

References

1999 albums
Backstreet Boys albums
Jive Records albums
Albums produced by Max Martin
Albums produced by Rami Yacoub
Albums recorded at Cheiron Studios
Albums recorded at Polar Studios
Juno Award for International Album of the Year albums